The following is a list of Fitzroy Football Club leading goalkickers in each of their seasons in the Australian Football League (formerly the Victorian Football League).

References
Fitzroy Honour Roll

Goalkickers
Fitzroy Football Club goalkickers
Fitzroy Football Club goalkickers